The Boston Society of Film Critics Award for Best Animated Film is one of the annual awards given by the Boston Society of Film Critics since 2008.

Winners

2000s
2008: Wall-E
2009: Up

2010s
2010: Toy Story 3
2011: Rango
2012: Frankenweenie
2013: The Wind Rises
2014: The Tale of the Princess Kaguya
2015: Anomalisa
2016: Tower
2017: Coco
2018: Isle of Dogs
2019: I Lost My Body

2020s
2020: The Wolf House
2021: Flee
2022: Turning Red

See also
Academy Award for Best Animated Feature

References

External links
Official website

Boston Society of Film Critics Awards
Awards established in 2008
Awards for best animated feature film